Guillaume de Montfort, also known as Guillaume of Hainaut, was a French nobleman of the end of the 10th century, the first Lord of Montfort-l'Amaury.

He was succeeded as Lord of Montfort-l'Amaury by his son Amaury I de Montfort.

Guillaume is possibly the son of Amaury, Count of Valenciennes.

Bibliography
 
 

Lords of France

Guillaume
Guillaume

10th-century births
11th-century deaths
Year of birth unknown
Year of death unknown

References